Kohn Pedersen Fox Associates (KPF) is an American architecture firm that provides architecture, interior, programming and master planning services for clients in both the public and private sectors. KPF is one of the largest architecture firms in New York City, where it is headquartered.

History

Beginnings in the United States (1976–1980s)
KPF was founded in 1976 by A. Eugene Kohn, William Pedersen, and Sheldon Fox, all of whom coordinated their departure from John Carl Warnecke & Associates, among the largest architectural firms in the country. Shortly thereafter, the American Broadcasting Company (ABC) chose KPF to redevelop a former armory building on Manhattan's West Side to house TV studios and offices. This led to 14 more projects for ABC over the next 11 years, as well as commissions from major corporations across the country, including AT&T and Hercules Incorporated. By the mid-1980s, KPF had nearly 250 architects working on projects in cities throughout the United States. In 1985, John Burgee (of rival architecture firm John Burgee Architects) called KPF "The best commercial firm now practicing in the U.S." KPF's design for 333 Wacker Drive in Chicago (1983), which was awarded the AIA National Honor Award in 1984, made the firm nationally famous. It remains a Chicago landmark, and was voted "Favorite Building" by the readers of the Chicago Tribune in both 1995 and 1997.
In 1986, KPF's Procter & Gamble Headquarters in Cincinnati, which included an open plan interior design by Patricia Conway, was recognized for its innovative design with the AIA National Honor Award.

After its success with these projects, KPF was selected to design the IBM World Headquarters in Armonk, New York (1997), the Chicago Title and Trust Building in Chicago (1992), and the Federal Reserve Bank of Dallas (1993).

In the 1990s, KPF also took on a larger number of government and civic projects, including the Foley Square U.S. Courthouse in New York (1995), the Mark O. Hatfield U.S. Courthouse in Portland, Oregon (1996), the U.S. Courthouse of Minneapolis (1996), the Buffalo Niagara International Airport (1993) and the multiple award-winning redevelopment of The World Bank Headquarters in Washington, D.C. (1996).

KPF's winning entry in the international competition for the World Bank Headquarters, which drew 76 entrants from 26 countries, was the only entry that included the retention of existing structures.

Expansion to Europe (1980s–1990s)
In the 1980s and 1990s, KPF transformed from an American firm known for its corporate designs into an international firm with institutional, government, and transportation commissions in addition to corporate work.

KPF completed the design for two blocks of the large-scale Canary Wharf redevelopment (1987) and the Goldman Sachs Headquarters on Fleet Street (1987–1991). KPF has been selected for projects in the Canary Wharf area through to the present day, including the Clifford Chance Tower (2002) to KPMG's European Headquarters (2009). KPF's subsequent work in the United Kingdom includes Thames Court in London (1998), the Rothermere American Institute at Oxford University (2001) and the master plan for the London School of Economics (2002). KPF's design for the award-winning Westendstraße 1 in Frankfurt (1992), an early example of mixed-use design, further increased the firm's international prominence and solidified the firm's reputation as a progressive global practice. KPF was chosen for subsequent projects throughout Europe, including Provinciehuis in The Hague (1998), Danube House in River City, Prague (2003), the expansion and renovation of the World Trade Center in Amsterdam (2004) and the Endesa Headquarters in Madrid (2003).

Work in Asia and internationally (1990s–2009)
KPF's introduction to the Asian market began with the  Japan Railways Central Towers project in Nagoya (1999). Within 10 years, KPF had projects in Japan, Korea, Indonesia, Thailand, Hong Kong, Taiwan and mainland China. Completed KPF projects in Asia include Plaza 66 on Shanghai's Nanjing Xi Lu (2001), Roppongi Hills in Tokyo (2003), Continental Engineering Corporation Tower in Taipei (2003), the Rodin Pavilion in Seoul (2003), the Merrill Lynch Japan Head Office in Tokyo (2004), Shr-Hwa International Tower in Taichung (2004), and the Shanghai World Financial Center (2008), which was named the "Best Tall Building Overall" by the Council on Tall Buildings and the Urban Habitat in 2008. KPF worked with renowned structural engineers, Leslie E. Robertson Associates, to maximize the tower's floor plate and material efficiency by perfecting its tapered form. In addition to this work in Asia, KPF has completed projects in: the Middle East, including the Abu Dhabi Investment Authority Headquarters (2007) and the Marina Towers (2008); South America including Ventura Corporate Towers in Rio de Janeiro (2008) and Infinity Tower in São Paulo (2012); Australia, including Chifley Tower in Sydney (1992); and has also worked on several projects in Africa.

Expanded national and global presence (2010–present) 
Four decades after its founding, KPF has refined particular expertise in the area of office design, supertall structures, and large-scale, urban, mixed use developments.

In November 2018, the firm announced the opening of new offices in San Francisco, Berlin, and Singapore to support current projects, new commissions, and imminent endeavors in those regions.

The firm's high-profile projects include One Vanderbilt, a new supertall office tower in Midtown Manhattan located next to Grand Central Terminal and providing direct access to the station; and the master plan for Hudson Yards, the largest private real estate development in U.S. history, which mixes residences with offices, hotels and retail, and street life. KPF also designed buildings 10 Hudson Yards, 20 Hudson Yards, 30 Hudson Yards, and 55 Hudson Yards, which together offer office, retail, and hospitality space within the development.

Also in New York, KPF is leading the redevelopment of New York City Housing Authority's (NYCHA) Red Hook Houses, which suffered severe flooding and wind damage during Superstorm Sandy in 2012. The largest public housing development in Brooklyn, Red Hook Houses accommodates over 6,000 people across 28 buildings.

Outside of the United States, KPF has been contributing to the regeneration and conservation of the Covent Garden Estate in the roles of both master planner and architect for a collection of buildings. Also in London, the firm designed 52 Lime Street, known as The Scalpel.

Recent work
KPF's projects include civic and cultural spaces, commercial office buildings, transportation facilities, residential and hospitality developments, educational and institutional facilities, and mixed-use commercial developments.

In Boston, KPF is currently designing two waterfront projects: Channelside, three buildings with housing, office, labs, and retail on the Fort Point Waterfront and The Pinnacle at Central Wharf, a 600-foot residential, office, and retail tower downtown. KPF is also designing the University of Michigan's Detroit Center for Innovation, 601 West Pender in Vancouver, 81 Newgate Street in London, and The Bermondsey Project in south London, which will create around 1,548 homes on the site. KPF is also planning and designing the new Hong Kong University of Science and Technology "sustainable, smart campus" in Guangzhou.

Recent projects 
 CUNY Advanced Science Research Centers in New York City (2015)
 52 Lime Street in London (2018)

Achievements 
KPF has been involved in the design of some of the world's tallest buildings including: Ping-An Financial Centre in Shenzhen, China at 600 m / 1,969 ft.; the Lotte World Tower in Seoul, South Korea at 555 m / 1,820 ft.; the CTF Finance Center in Guangzhou, China at 530 m / 1,739 ft.; the CITIC Tower in Beijing, China at 528 m / 1,732 ft; and Shanghai World Financial Center in Shanghai, China at 492 m / 1,614 ft.

KPF takes on a large number of restoration and renovation projects. Examples of this work include The World Bank Headquarters, Unilever House, and The Landmark in Hong Kong. KPF has been recognized for workplace collaboration. KPF's intranet "Architectural Forum" has been described in Architectural Record as an example of "a resource that contributes to a learning environment through mentoring supporting teams and individuals with new ideas, and sharing best practices".

See also
 Kohn Pedersen Fox buildings
 List of architecture firms
 List of architects

References

External links

 
 Kohn Pedersen Fox Associates on Architizer

Architecture firms based in New York City
Design companies established in 1976
1976 establishments in New York City